Zombie Powder, zombie powder, or zombiepowder may refer to:
 Zombiepowder., a cancelled 1999 manga series by Tite Kubo
 Tetrodotoxin, a poison allegedly used by practitioners of certain Afro-American religions to paralyse a person